Glenn Robertson (born 1 November 1952) is a former Australian rules footballer who played with Fitzroy in the Victorian Football League (VFL).

Notes

External links 
		

1952 births
Australian rules footballers from Victoria (Australia)
Fitzroy Football Club players
Living people